Fernwood is a village and civil parish in the Newark and Sherwood district of Nottinghamshire, England. The parish, which then included Balderton, had a population of 10,298 in 2001. It is a suburb of Newark-on-Trent. The population of the civil parish was given as 2,190 in the 2011 Census. Balderton was by that time a separate civil parish.

References

External links

Villages in Nottinghamshire
Newark and Sherwood